Tachina amurensis is a species of fly in the genus Tachina of the family Tachinidae that can be found in Japan and Russia.

References

Insects described in 1929
Diptera of Asia
amurensis